The 1985 NCAA Skiing Championships were contested at the Bridger Bowl Ski Area in Bozeman, Montana as part of the 32nd annual NCAA-sanctioned ski tournament to determine the individual and team national champions of men's and women's collegiate slalom skiing and cross-country skiing in the United States.

Wyoming, coached by Tim Ameel, claimed their second team national championship, 20 points ahead of Utah in the cumulative team standings.

Venue

This year's NCAA skiing championships were hosted at the Bridger Bowl Ski Area near Bozeman, Montana.

These were the third championships held in the state of Montana (1960, 1983, and 1985).

Team scoring

See also
List of NCAA skiing programs

References

1985 in sports in Montana
NCAA Skiing Championships
NCAA Skiing Championships
1985 in alpine skiing
1985 in cross-country skiing